The Rubik R-18 Kánya is a Hungarian light utility and glider tug aircraft. It was designed by Ernő Rubik, the father of the designer of the Rubik's Cube.

Design
Ernő Rubik was a co-founder and the chief designer of the Aero-Ever aircraft company of Esztergom, Hungary, which was formed in 1938. He started design of the R-18 in 1944, inspired by the Fieseler Fi 156 Storch, aiming for a smaller, lighter version, which would serve both as a glider tug and a STOL utility aircraft, to carry engineers and spares to service aircraft at other airports.

The aircraft has a high wing braced by V-struts, with fixed leading-edge slots and retractable camber-changing flaps. The fuselage is of mixed construction with two side-by-side seats, with an optional third seat behind them. It has a conventional braced tailplane and a taildragger undercarriage with divided axle long-stroke oleo legs for the main gear, and a fixed tailwheel.

Development
Construction started in 1946, and the first flight of the prototype, the R-18a,  c/n E-524, was on 18 May 1949. It was powered by a Walter Major 4-I four-cylinder inline engine of  driving a two-bladed wooden propeller. The aircraft was well received, and was used, for a time, by the Hungarian Air Force, registered 1-002, but was soon replaced and transferred to a flying club, registered HA-RUA.

The second aircraft, the R-18b, c/n E-525, registered HA-RUB, had a widened rear fuselage to make the occupant of the third seat more comfortable. It flew from 1949 to 1954 when it crashed.

The cabin windows and doors were slightly redesigned, and the third seat was replaced by a  fuel tank. The conversion work was done by the Central Experimental Plant at Alag, between 1955 and 1958.

Construction of a metal version, the R-28 Metal-Kanya, was started but was not completed.

Operational history
The first three aircraft were considered prototypes, and they were followed by six production aircraft, all designated R-18c and built in 1953-54. They were registered HA-RUD to HA-RUI. One aircraft was fitted with skis for winter use. They continued in use until 1966 by which time all aircraft except two had crashed and/or been scrapped or withdrawn from use.

The R-18a crashed in 1949 and was subsequently used as an instructional airframe.

Survivors

Two aircraft survive: 
 HA-RUF, c/n E-778, was withdrawn from use in 1966 but was restored to flying condition in 2012 by the Goldtimer Foundation, and is based at Budaörs Airport, Budapest.
 HA-RUG, c/n E-779, was withdrawn from use in 1966, and was placed on display in the Hungarian Technical and Transportation Museum in Budapest, but the building was demolished in 2016 and the current status of the aircraft is unknown.

Specifications (R-18a)

References

Rubik aircraft
High-wing aircraft
Single-engined tractor aircraft
Aircraft first flown in 1948